Shlomo Goren (February 3, 1917 – October 29, 1994), was a Polish-born Israeli Orthodox Religious Zionist rabbi and Talmudic scholar who was considered a foremost authority on Jewish law (Halakha). Goren founded and served as the first head of the Military Rabbinate of the Israel Defense Forces (IDF). Subsequently, he was the third Ashkenazi Chief Rabbi of Israel from 1973 to 1983, after which he established a yeshiva in Jerusalem, which he headed until his death.

Goren served in the IDF during three wars, wrote several award-winning books on Jewish law, and was appointed Chief Rabbi of Tel Aviv in 1968.

Childhood
Goren was born in Zambrów, Poland to Abraham and Haya Tzipora Goronczik. The family immigrated to the British Mandate of Palestine in 1925. The family was among the founders of Kfar Hasidim, a village of religious Jews near Haifa where Goren grew up.

Education
As a young boy he was sent to Jerusalem to study at the Etz Chaim yeshiva. Later he became the youngest student to enter the prestigious Hebron yeshiva in Jerusalem at age 12, where he was identified as a prodigy. His first book, dealing with Temple sacrifices, was published when he was 17 years old. He received rabbinic ordination at age 17.

Goren studied philosophy, mathematics and classics at the Hebrew University from 1940 until 1944.

Military career

Goren's career was characterized by a commitment to the Religious Zionist values of his youth. He volunteered for the Haganah in 1936, and served as a chaplain for the Jerusalem area during the 1948 War of Independence, during which he tested for and qualified as an IDF paratrooper. Goren was a Chaplain of the Carmeli Brigade during the war. Immediately after the War of Independence, he engaged, often at great personal risk, in the collecting of the bodies and giving proper burial to soldiers whose remains had been left in the field. He strongly opposed the idea of separate religious and secular units and worked for the integration of all soldiers in united army units. He was the most prominent halakhist involved in rulings for religious soldiers regarding their army service. Goren was eventually promoted to the rank of Brigadier-General.

Following the establishment of the State of Israel, Goren was appointed Chief Rabbi of the Military Rabbinate of the IDF with the rank of Major-General, a position he held until 1968. Rabbi Goren used the opportunity to help establish and organize the military chaplaincy's framework, streamlining processes to get soldiers accommodations for kosher food and prayer services. Goren personally wrote a new prayerbook to accommodate the different prayer styles used by various ethnic groups serving in the army.

Goren also served in the 1956 Suez Crisis and the 1967 Six-Day War, where he was promoted to a full General. Goren was on hand during the conquest of East Jerusalem on 7 June 1967, where he gave a prayer of thanksgiving broadcast live to the entire country. Shortly afterward Goren, blowing a shofar and carrying a Torah scroll, held the first Jewish prayer session at the Western Wall since 1948. The event was one of the defining moments of the war, and several photographs of Goren, surrounded by soldiers in prayer, have since become famous around the world and particularly in Israel. The most famous photograph shows Goren blowing the shofar against the background of the Western Wall.

Controversy

Goren attracted many admirers through his passion for Religious Zionism and his combining Zionist activism with a commitment to Judaism and Jewish scholarship. However, his uncompromising personality later resulted in him becoming a polarizing and controversial figure in Israeli politics.  Goren called the vehement attacks on him a "moral and religious scandal."

The Langer Controversy

In November 1972, Goren presided over a panel of nine dayanim to review the case of Sgt. Maj. Hanoch Langer, and his sister Miriam, who had been declared mamzerim, and therefore ineligible for marriage to an Israelite by a Beit Din in Petah Tikva.

The Langer children had been designated as mamzerim because their mother had married their father, without having been divorced from her previous husband, thus committing adultery according to Jewish law.

Fearing a review of the case would prompt the secularists in the Government, such as Gideon Hausner of the Independent Liberal Party, to press for the introduction of civil marriage in Israel to break the rabbinate's exclusive control over marriage, Goren controversially reversed the ruling.

Goren's reversal was fiercely opposed, primarily by the Agudat Yisrael and Rav Ovadiah Yosef. However, some prominent rabbis, such as Rav Soloveitchik and Rav Yosef Eliahu Henkin came out in support of Goren.

The controversy severely affected Goren's reputation.

Halakha
Goren spent most of his term as Chief Rabbi of Israel attempting to reconcile Jewish religious teachings with modern problems of the state, including advancements in technological progress and various high-profile conversion cases. Goren often clashed with his more conservative rabbinical colleagues.

One example of Goren's desire to adapt Halakha to changing realities in science was his controversial stance on Kiddush Levana, the monthly blessing over the new moon. A prayer customarily added after the blessing contains the words "just as I dance before you and am unable to touch you." Goren said that since the Americans landed on the moon in 1969, this line should be changed to reflect that it is, in fact, possible to touch the moon.

Religious-Zionist activism

Temple Mount

Goren repeatedly advocated or supported building a Third Temple on the Temple Mount from the 1960s onward, and was associated with various messianic projects involving the Temple Mount. He was well known for his controversial positions concerning Jewish sovereignty over the Temple Mount. On 15 August 1967, two months after the Six-Day War, Goren led a group of fifty Jews onto the Temple Mount, where, fighting off protesting Muslim guards and Israeli police, they defiantly held a prayer service. Goren continued to pray for many years in the Makhkame building overlooking the Temple Mount, where he conducted yearly High Holiday services. His call for the establishment of a synagogue on the Temple Mount has subsequently been reiterated by his brother-in-law, the former Chief Rabbi of Haifa, She'ar Yashuv Cohen.

Goren was sharply criticized by the Israeli Defense Ministry, who, noting Goren's senior rank, called his behavior inappropriate. The episode led the Chief Rabbis of the time to restate the accepted laws of Judaism that no Jews were allowed on the mount due to issues of ritual impurity. The secular authorities welcomed this ruling as it preserved the status quo with the Waqf, the Islamic authority. Disagreeing with his colleagues, Goren continually maintained that Jews were not only permitted, but commanded, to ascend and pray on the mount.

The actual question of Goren's radicalism remains controversial. One widely repeated story about Goren claims that shortly after the Israeli capture of the Temple Mount, the rabbi either argued that Israel should destroy the al Aqsa Mosque and Dome of the Rock, or simply said that it would have been a "good thing" if they had been accidentally destroyed. The charge, made by General Narkiss, an eyewitness, in an interview with Haaretz that Rabbi Goren calling for the destruction of the mosques has been used to claim there is a Jewish extremism comparable to Islamic extremism. Goren's close assistant Rabbi Menachem Ha-Cohen, who was with Rabbi Goren throughout that historic day, denied ever hearing Goren make such a remark. Goren himself personally denied this charge several times. However, Goren did make a speech later that year to a military convention, recorded and later broadcast on Israel's army radio, in which he said of the Dome of the Rock and the al-Aqsa Mosque that "Certainly we should have blown it up. It is a tragedy that we did not do so."

After retiring from official duties as Chief Rabbi, Goren opened and lead the Idra Yeshiva near the Western Wall. The yeshiva changed and was renamed after Goren's death.

Dig at alleged "Gate Synagogue"
In the summer of 1983, Goren and several other rabbis joined Rabbi Yehuda Getz, who worked for the Religious Affairs Ministry at the Western Wall, in touring a chamber underneath the mount that Getz had illegally excavated, where the two claimed to have seen the Ark of the Covenant. The excavation was shortly discovered and resulted in a massive brawl between young Jews and Arabs in the area. The access tunnel to the chamber was quickly sealed with concrete by Israeli police. The sealed entrance can be seen from the Western Wall Tunnel, which opened to the public in 1996.

Opposition to Oslo Accords
Goren also made headlines after his term as Chief Rabbi had expired. He was deeply opposed to the Oslo Accords and in 1993 declared that it was halakhically forbidden to dismantle any settlements in the Biblical Land of Israel, and encouraged any soldiers ordered to do so to refuse. In 1994 he announced that Halakha made it a duty for Jews to kill Yasser Arafat, because he endangered Jewish lives.

Relation with Christian denominations
Goren, who was a strong supporter of alliances between Evangelical Christians and Israel, also denounced meetings between Israel and the Holy See, calling it "blasphemy beyond expression."

Opposition to Jewish terrorism
Goren has spoken out against Jewish terrorism. In 1982 he and Rabbi Ovadia Yosef officially condemned a shooting attack on the Temple Mount by an American immigrant which resulted in the death of two Muslims and the wounding of several others. In a joint statement released by the Chief Rabbis, they declared that "We and the entire Jewish people attack and deplore the criminal act of murder in every possible way. Through this abominable act [Alan] Goodman has removed himself from the Jewish people...".

Educational activity
Goren was a manager of Kollel, where he met and educated Rabbi Joel Landau. Landau helped him in managing the Kollel.

Following his term as Ashkenazi Chief Rabbi, he founded the Idra Yeshiva near the Western Wall, which he headed until his passing.

Halakhic and other published work
 Goren's first work was on the Mishneh Torah of Maimonides, published at age seventeen.
 Sha'arei Taharah on Tractate Mikva'ot, a study of the laws concerning ritual baths (mikva'ot), published at the age of twenty-one. It received an "enthusiastic approbatio" from Rabbi Isser Zalman Meltzer, who had been his rebbe.
 A number of responsa regarding the application of Jewish Law in a modern army
 With Might and Strength: An Autobiography, an (auto)biography redacted by Avi Rath based on his interviews with Goren (2013 in Hebrew, 2016 in English)

Vegetarianism
Goren was a strict vegetarian after he visited a slaughterhouse in Canada in 1967 to perform an inspection of kashrut.

Awards
 In 1961, Goren was awarded the Israel Prize in Rabbinical literature.

Personal life
Goren was married to Tzfia Cohen, the daughter of prominent Religious Zionist Rabbi David Cohen, the Nazir of Jerusalem, and the sister of Rabbi She'ar Yashuv Cohen, former deputy-mayor of Jerusalem and later Chief Rabbi of Haifa. Both Goren's father-in-law and brother-in-law were also prominent rabbinical vegetarians.

Rabbi Goren and Tzfia Goren had three children: retired justice Tchiya Shapiro; psychologist Drorit Tamari; and Abraham (Rami) Goren, executive vice president of Elbit Imaging.

Quotes
 "Human life is undoubtedly a supreme value in Judaism, as expressed both in the Halacha and the prophetic ethic. This refers not only to Jews, but to all men created in the image of God."
"It is clear that according to Halacha (Jewish religious law), a soldier who receives an order that runs contrary to Torah law should uphold the Halacha, and not the secular order. And since settling the land is a commandment, and uprooting the settlements is breaking the commandment, the soldier should not carry out an order to uproot settlements. This government does not lean on a majority of Jewish support, but rather on Arab votes. According to the Halacha it does not have the authority of a majority, and therefore government directives to uproot the settlements do not have the authority of the majority of the people." (NRP newspaper Hatzofeh, 19 December 1993.)

Bibliography
The Crown of Holiness, an interpretation and commentary on Maimonides' Mishneh Torah, 1934.
Sha’rei Taharah, a study on the laws of niddah, 1940.
Ha-Yerushalmi ha-Meforash, commentary on the Jerusalem Talmud, 1961. Recipient of the Israel Prize for Jewish Scholarship.

See also
 List of Israel Prize recipients
 Jewish vegetarianism

References

External links
Jewish Ideas Daily: The Warrior Rabbi
Shlomo Goren
Jsource Biography
OU Biography
Rabbinic Teachings on Vegetarianism, edited by Richard Schwartz, Ph.D., from the Jewish Virtual Library
Goren Biography from Western Wall Heritage Society Newsletter
Rabbi Eliezer Melamed, 'Rabbi Goren and the Temple Mount' on Arutz Sheva.
Gorenberg, Gershom. End of Days : Fundamentalism and the Struggle for the Temple Mount. Free Press, 2000. 

1917 births
1994 deaths
Chief rabbis of Israel
Israeli generals
Israel Prize Rabbi recipients
Israel Prize in Rabbinical literature recipients
Orthodox rabbis in Mandatory Palestine
Religious Zionist Orthodox rabbis
Polish emigrants to Israel
People from Zambrów
Israeli Orthodox rabbis
Israeli people of Polish-Jewish descent
20th-century Israeli rabbis
Chief rabbis of Tel Aviv
Israel Defense Forces rabbis
Burials at the Jewish cemetery on the Mount of Olives
Israeli military chaplains